Virginio Pizzali (28 December 1934 – 14 November 2021) was an Italian cyclist. He competed at the 1956 Summer Olympics, winning a gold medal in the team pursuit event.

References

External links
 

1934 births
2021 deaths
Italian male cyclists
Olympic cyclists of Italy
Cyclists at the 1956 Summer Olympics
People from Mortegliano
Olympic gold medalists for Italy
Olympic medalists in cycling
Medalists at the 1956 Summer Olympics
Cyclists from Friuli Venezia Giulia